Anadelphia is a genus of African plants in the grass family.

 Species

 formerly included
see Schizachyrium 
 Anadelphia lomaensis  - Schizachyrium lomaense

See also 
 List of Poaceae genera

References

External links 
 Grassbase - The World Online Grass Flora

Andropogoneae
Flora of Africa
Poaceae genera
Taxa named by Eduard Hackel